Keeve and keeving are terms used in:
 Cider making
 Ore dressing
 Kier (industrial), or keeve, kier, or kieve, a large boiler or vat used in bleaching cotton

See also
Kyiv